Chandisthan  is a town and market place at Besishahar Municipality in Lamjung District in Gandaki Province of northern-central Nepal. The Besishahar Municipality was formed by merging the existing Village Development Committees i.e. Besishahar, Gaunshahar, Udipur & Chandisthan on 15 May 2014.

Population
At the time of the 2011 Nepal census it had a population of 1,895(1,031 Female & 864 Male) people living in 492 individual Households.

See also
 Besishahar Municipality
 Gaunshahar
 Udipur
 Lamjung District

References

Lamjung District
Populated places in Lamjung District